Orthogonius opacus is a species of ground beetle in the subfamily Orthogoniinae. It was described by Schmidt-Gobel in 1846.

References

opacus
Beetles described in 1846